Ziola or Zioła is a surname. Notable people with the surname include:

 Kirk Ziola, Canadian curler
 Piotr Zioła (born 1995), Polish singer

See also
 
 Zola (name)

Polish-language surnames